Aberdeen Creek is a  long 3rd order tributary to Drowning Creek (Lumber River), in Moore County, North Carolina.

History
Most of the area around Aberdeen Creek was settled by Scots-Irish Immigrants in the 1700s.  Historically the major industry was naval stores from the surrounding pine forests, but this has changed to include thriving retirement communities.  The creek was named Devil Gut Creek until 1887, when it was changed to Aberdeen Creek.

Variant names
According to the Geographic Names Information System, it has also been known historically as:  
Devil Creek
Devils Gut Creek

Course
Aberdeen Creek rises on the Mill Creek divide about 1 mile east of Pinehurst in Moore County, North Carolina.  Aberdeen Creek then takes a southerly course through numerous swamps to meet Drowning Creek about 2 miles southwest of Addor.

Watershed
Aberdeen Creek drains  of area, receives about 49.3 in/year of precipitation, has a topographic wetness index of 473.33 and is about 29% forested.

See also
List of North Carolina Rivers

Maps

References

Rivers of North Carolina
Rivers of Moore County, North Carolina